H. S. Miller Bank is located in Prescott, Wisconsin. In addition to being a bank, the building also served as the city hall and was added to the National Register of Historic Places in 1994.

Currently, it houses the Prescott Historical Society Museum and the local chamber of commerce.

References

Buildings and structures in Pierce County, Wisconsin
Historical society museums in Wisconsin
City halls in Wisconsin
Bank buildings on the National Register of Historic Places in Wisconsin
Romanesque architecture
Italianate architecture in Wisconsin
National Register of Historic Places in Pierce County, Wisconsin